Route 138 is a major highway in the Canadian province of Quebec, following the entire north shore of the Saint Lawrence River past Montreal to the temporary eastern terminus in Kegashka on the Gulf of Saint Lawrence. The western terminus is in Elgin, at the border with New York State south-west of Montreal (connecting with New York State Route 30 at the Trout River Border Crossing). Part of this highway is known as the Chemin du Roy, or King's Highway, which is one of the oldest highways in Canada.

It passes through the Montérégie, Montreal, Lanaudière, Mauricie, Capitale-Nationale and Côte-Nord regions of Quebec. In Montreal, Highway 138 runs via Sherbrooke Street, crosses the Pierre Le Gardeur Bridge to Charlemagne and remains a four-lane road until exiting Repentigny.

This highway takes a more scenic route than the more direct Autoroute 40 between Montreal and Quebec City. It crosses the Saguenay River via a ferry which travels between Baie-Sainte-Catherine and Tadoussac; in the event of a closure of this ferry, drivers must take a significant detour via Quebec Route 172 and Quebec Route 170 to the city of Saguenay in order to cross the river by bridge.

Until the mid-1990s, the highway's eastern terminus was Havre-Saint-Pierre, but in 1996 the extension to Natashquan was completed. A 40 km gravel section between Natashquan and Kegashka opened on September 26, 2013, with the inauguration of a bridge across the Natashquan River.

A second segment of about 17 km extends from Tête-à-la-Baleine's airport, east through Tête-à-la-Baleine, to the ferry terminal southeast of Tête-à-la-Baleine.  There is also a 10.7 km roadway, la route Mecatina, from Mutton Bay to a ferry terminal in La Tabatière and continuing beyond.

A third segment of Route 138 extends from Old Fort to the Newfoundland and Labrador border (connecting with Newfoundland and Labrador Provincial Route 510), near Blanc-Sablon on the eastern end of the Côte-Nord.

A gap remains between Kegashka and Old Fort, through isolated communities accessible only by coastal ferry. On August 25, 2006, the Quebec government announced a 10-year project to connect the two segments by building 425 km of highway along the Lower North Shore. In 2011, the Quebec government announced an additional $122 million investment for the project over five years as part of the Plan Nord. However, by 2013 difficulties ensued between the Quebec Ministry of Transport and the Pakatan Corporation, who was previously responsible for managing the funding for this project, leading to the termination of agreement between the two. By this time only 12 km of this road had been built, plus some additional engineering work and deforestation. The construction of two segments of the highway (Kegashka–La Romaine and Tête-à-la-Baleine–La Tabatière) was set to begin in 2019. A total of $232 million will be contributed to this project.

Municipalities along Route 138

 Elgin
 Godmanchester
 Huntingdon
 Ormstown
 Très-Saint-Sacrement
 Howick
 Sainte-Martine
 Mercier
 Châteauguay
 Kahnawake
 Montreal (LaSalle)
 Montreal-Ouest
 Montreal (Notre-Dame-de-Grâce)
 Westmount
 Montreal (Ville-Marie / Rosemont–La Petite-Patrie / Anjou)
 Montréal-Est
 Montreal (Rivière-des-Prairies–Pointe-aux-Trembles)
 Repentigny
 Saint-Sulpice
 Lavaltrie
 Lanoraie
 Sainte-Geneviève-de-Berthier
 Berthierville
 Saint-Cuthbert
 Saint-Barthélemy
 Maskinongé
 Louiseville
 Yamachiche
 Trois-Rivières (Pointe-du-Lac / Trois-Rivières-Ouest / Trois-Rivières / Cap-de-la-Madeleine)
 Champlain
 Batiscan
 Sainte-Anne-de-la-Pérade
 Deschambault-Grondines
 Portneuf
 Cap-Santé
 Donnacona
 Neuville
 Saint-Augustin-de-Desmaures
 Quebec City (Cap-Rouge)
 L'Ancienne-Lorette 
 Quebec City (Les Rivières / La Cité-Limoilou / Beauport)
 Boischatel
 L'Ange-Gardien
 Château-Richer
 Sainte-Anne-de-Beaupré
 Beaupré

 Saint-Joachim
 Saint-Louis-de-Gonzague-du-Cap-Tourmente
 Saint-Tite-des-Caps
 Petite-Rivière-Saint-François
 Baie-Saint-Paul
 Saint-Urbain
 Saint-Hilarion
 Saint-Aimé-des-Lacs
 Clermont
 La Malbaie
 Saint-Siméon
 Baie-Sainte-Catherine (ferry to 138 continuation in Tadoussac)
 Tadoussac
 Sacré-Coeur
 Les Bergeronnes
 Les Escoumins
 Longue-Rive
 Portneuf-sur-Mer
 Forestville
 Colombier
 Betsiamites
 Ragueneau
 Chute-aux-Outardes
 Pointe-aux-Outardes
 Baie-Comeau
 Franquelin
 Godbout
 Baie-Trinité
 Port-Cartier
 Uashat
 Sept-Îles
 Rivière-au-Tonnerre
 Rivière-Saint-Jean
 Longue-Pointe-de-Mingan
 Havre-Saint-Pierre
 Baie-Johan-Beetz
 Aguanish
 Natashquan
 Kegaska
gap in roadway
 Tête-à-la-Baleine
gap in roadway
 Vieux-Fort
 Blanc Sablon

Major intersections

See also
 Quebec Route 2 (historical) and Chemin du Roy
 List of Quebec provincial highways

References

External links

 Provincial Route Map (Courtesy of the Quebec Ministry of Transportation) 
 Overview Google map for QC 138 from Montreal border to Natashquan
Overview Google map for QC 138 from Montreal to New York border
Overview Google map for QC 138 from dead end to Newfoundland and Labrador border

138
Baie-Comeau
Baie-Saint-Paul
Châteauguay
Louiseville
Transport in Repentigny, Quebec
Roads in Montreal
Streets in Quebec City
Transport in Sept-Îles, Quebec
Transport in Trois-Rivières